Humse Badhkar Kaun is a 1998 Indian Hindi-language action film directed by Deepak Anand and produced by Shyam Bajaj. It stars Sunil Shetty, Saif Ali Khan, Sonali Bendre and Deepti Bhatnagar in pivotal roles.

Cast
 Sunil Shetty... Bhola / Suraj
 Saif Ali Khan... Sunny
 Sonali Bendre... Anu
 Deepti Bhatnagar... Venee
 Raza Murad... Sudarshan Sinha
 Beena Banerjee... Chief Minister Gayetri Devi
 Mushtaq Khan... Sir John
 Mukesh Rishi... Akal
 Mohan Joshi... Jabbar

Plot

Bhola, a villager, comes to city to meet his brother Sunny, a con-man, a Roadside Romeo, a car dealer, a thief all rolled into one. The brothers meet Sunny, who exploits Bhola and uses his strength and innocence to his benefit, but ultimately he succumbs to Bhola's innocence. Sunny has a girlfriend. Sunny, Bhola, Anu and Venee set off on a romantic journey, where love blossoms between the four. To their surprise, the brothers discover that their mother is Gayatri Devi, who is no other than the Chief Minister of the state. Gayatri Devi's aide Sudharshan Sinha is her advisor. Raza, along with Jabbar and terrorist leader Aakal are her biggest enemies, because she refuses to free Aakal's brothers, who are in police custody for criminal activities. Bhola and Sunny have to fight them to reach their mother and free the state from the terrorists.

Soundtrack

References

External links

1990s Hindi-language films
1998 films